Henry Dagg is a sound sculptor and builder of experimental musical instruments who formerly worked as a sound engineer for the BBC.  His works include a pin barrel harp or sharpsichord which was commissioned for the English Folk Dance and Song Society, a pair of steel sculptural musical gates for Rochester Independent College and a cat organ which he played to the amusement of an audience of celebrities at a garden party hosted by Prince Charles.

References

Modern sculptors
British experimental musicians
Living people
Year of birth missing (living people)